Economic Thought is a biannual peer-reviewed open access academic journal. It was established in 2012 and is published by the World Economics Association.

An innovative feature of the journal is its Open Peer Discussion forum. Submitted papers that meet an acceptable standard of quality are first posted on the forum before a decision is taken on publication.

The journal is abstracted/indexed in Scopus, Research Papers in Economics, Directory of Open Access Journals, PhilPapers, and EconLit.

References

External links 
 
 Listing at College Publications

Economics journals
Publications established in 2012
English-language journals
Bimonthly journals
Open access journals